Banana bread is a type of sweet bread made from mashed bananas. It is often a moist and sweet quick bread but some recipes are yeast raised.

History
Bananas appeared in the US in the 1870s but it took a while for them to appear as ingredients in desserts. Banana bread recipes began to appear in cookbooks across North America when baking powder became available in grocery stores in the 1930s. Some food historians believe banana bread was a byproduct of the Great Depression as resourceful housewives did not wish to throw away overripe bananas. Others believe that banana bread was developed in corporate kitchens to promote flour and baking soda products. Banana bread experienced a resurgence in popularity in 2020 during the COVID-19 pandemic lockdowns.

In the Philippines, banana bread is usually called "banana cake." It was introduced during the American colonial period of the Philippines.

February 23 is National Banana Bread Day.

Variations
 Banana raisin bread
 Banana nut bread (often featuring chopped nuts, such as walnuts, pecans or almonds)
 Chocolate chip banana bread (featuring chocolate chips)
 Banana bread muffins
 Banana Crumble Bread
 Vegan banana bread (made without eggs or dairy products)
 Blueberry banana bread (or other fruits such as raspberry or orange to add additional flavours)

See also 

 Banana cake
 Bánh chuối, a banana cake from Vietnam
 List of American breads
 List of banana dishes
 List of quick breads
 List of sweet breads
 Pumpkin bread
 Zucchini bread
 Carrot bread

References

Quick breads
Sweet breads
Banana dishes
American breads